The 1966 Georgia Bulldogs football team represented the University of Georgia during the 1966 NCAA University Division football season. In 1966, The Bulldogs went 10–1, with wins over seventh-ranked Florida and fifth-ranked Georgia Tech in the regular season and a win over tenth-ranked SMU in the Cotton Bowl Classic by a score of 24–9. Georgia finished as Southeastern Conference (SEC) co-champion with Alabama.

Schedule

Source: 1967 Georgia Bulldogs Football Media Guide/Yearbook

Roster

Game summaries

at Miami (FL)

Florida

Auburn

Georgia clinched a share of the SEC with the win, rallying in the second half after Auburn scored on its first two possessions.

References

Georgia
Georgia Bulldogs football seasons
Southeastern Conference football champion seasons
Cotton Bowl Classic champion seasons
Georgia Bulldogs football